Brett Anderson (born 1967) is an English singer-songwriter.

Brett Anderson may also refer to:

People 
 Brett Anderson (American musician) (born 1979, female), American vocalist for The Donnas
 Brett Anderson (rugby league) (born 1986), Australian rugby player
 Brett Anderson (baseball) (born 1988), American major league baseball player

Other 
 Brett Anderson (album), first solo album by the English singer-songwriter

See also 
 Bret Anderson

Anderson, Brett